The 1994 NCAA Rifle Championships were contested at the 15th annual competition to determine the team and individual national champions of NCAA co-ed collegiate rifle shooting in the United States. The championship was hosted by the Murray State University in Murray, Kentucky. 

Alaska upset six-time defending champions West Virginia to capture the team championship. It was the first championship for the Nanooks, who finished 7 points ahead of the Mountaineers in the standings.

The individual champions were, for the smallbore rifle, Cory Brunetti (Alaska), and Nancy Napolski (Kentucky), for the air rifle.

Qualification
Since there is only one national collegiate championship for rifle shooting, all NCAA rifle programs (whether from Division I, Division II, or Division III) were eligible. A total of six teams ultimately contested this championship.

Results
Scoring:  The championship consisted of 120 shots by each competitor in smallbore and 40 shots per competitor in air rifle.

Team title

Individual events

References

NCAA Rifle Championships
1994 in shooting sports
NCAA Rifle Championships
NCAA Rifle Championship